Hurricane Gordon was a long-lived and catastrophic late-season hurricane of the 1994 Atlantic hurricane season. The twelfth and final tropical cyclone of the season, Gordon formed as a tropical depression in the southwestern Caribbean on November 8. Without strengthening, the depression made landfall on Nicaragua. Later on November 10, the system began to strengthen as it tracked further from land, and it quickly strengthened into Tropical Storm Gordon, the seventh named storm that season. Gordon also made landfalls in Jamaica and Cuba while a minimal tropical storm. It entered the southwestern Atlantic while resembling a subtropical cyclone. By the time it entered the Gulf of Mexico, the storm was fully tropical again. Tropical Storm Gordon later crossed the Florida Keys, and turning to the northeast it made landfall in Fort Myers, Florida. Gordon strengthened after it re-entered the Atlantic Ocean, becoming a hurricane on November 17. It briefly threatened North Carolina while turning to the northwest, although it turned to the south and weakened. Gordon deteriorated into a tropical depression and struck Florida again at that intensity on November 20. It turned to the north and dissipated the next day over South Carolina.

Gordon first caused flooding in northern Costa Rica that destroyed 700 houses and caused $30 million in damage. There were six deaths in the country and an additional two deaths in neighboring Panama. Upon affecting Jamaica, the storm was responsible $11.8 million in damage and four deaths. Damage was heaviest in Haiti, after a prolonged southwesterly flow dropped  of rainfall in a 24‑hour period. The rains resulted in extensive mudslides and flooding that disrupted transportation and damaged 10,800 houses, with another 3,500 destroyed. There were 1,122 deaths in the country, partially due to deforested hills, and damage was estimated at $50 million. In the neighboring Dominican Republic, there were five additional deaths, as well as flooding near its capital. In Cuba, Gordon caused $100 million in damage, and 5,906 houses were damaged or destroyed. Due to large-scale evacuations, there were only two deaths in the country. In Florida, the storm caused $400 million in damage (1994 USD, equivalent to about $ million in ), much of it agricultural, and there were eleven deaths, eight of them direct. Gordon later affected North Carolina with high waves, causing beach erosion and destroying five houses. Overall damage was $594 million due to Gordon (1994 USD, equivalent to about $900 million in ).

International governments and agencies through the United Nations sent relief supplies and monetary assistance to Haiti, following Gordon's devastating impact there. American soldiers were already stationed in the country to restore the ousted Jean-Bertrand Aristide to the presidency. The troops helped in rescues and worked to restore a damaged road between Port-au-Prince and Jacmel. Despite the deaths and damage, the name was not retired following the season.

Meteorological history

The origins of Gordon were from a tropical wave in the southwestern Caribbean Sea, which developed a circulation north of Panama early on November 6. It gradually organized, becoming Tropical Depression Twelve on November 8 offshore eastern Nicaragua. Proximity to land prevented strengthening, and early on November 10 it made landfall near Puerto Cabezas, Nicaragua. Shortly thereafter, an upper-level trough turned the depression to the northeast, and late on November 10 it intensified into Tropical Storm Gordon after reaching open waters. The circulation of the cyclone was initially very broad, covering much of the western Caribbean Sea, and wind shear prevented significant strengthening. Early on November 13, Gordon struck Jamaica near Kingston as a minimal tropical storm, and later that day made landfall near Guantánamo Bay, Cuba. Around the time of Gordon crossing Jamaica, an upper-level trough spawned a low-level disturbance over the central Bahamas. From surface synoptic reports, the National Hurricane Center estimates Tropical Storm Gordon rapidly crossed Cuba and became the dominant system between Cuba and the Bahamas, but other meteorologists believe Gordon dissipated and that a second cyclone became the dominant system. The resultant storm north of Cuba became much larger, spreading rain across much of Florida.

A ridge to the north turned Gordon to the west-northwest, and by November 14 the cloud pattern resembled that of a subtropical cyclone, with little convection near and the strongest winds well-removed from the center. The storm paralleled the northern coast of Cuba and gradually developed convection near the center. On November 15, the broad center crossed the Florida Keys near Key West. Tropical Storm Gordon crossed the Florida peninsula in about nine hours, emerging into the Atlantic Ocean near Vero Beach. Gordon turned abruptly northwestward, and was briefly expected to cross the Outer Banks as a minimal hurricane. The hurricane turned to the south and south-southeast, weakening into a tropical storm due to stronger shear and drier air. On November 19, the storm turned to the southwest and later to the west. Gordon weakened into a tropical depression, before striking Florida again near Cape Canaveral on November 20. It later turned to the north and dissipated over South Carolina on November 21.

Preparations
When Gordon was approaching Jamaica on November 12, a tropical storm watch, and later warning, was issued for the island. The same day, a tropical storm warning was issued for southeastern Cuba from Camagüey to Guantanamo. On November 13, a tropical storm warning was issued for the southwest peninsula of Haiti, and later that day the same warning was issued for the Bahamas. Due to the storm, 65,000 people evacuated to safer locations in Cuba. Schools were closed in New Providence and Grand Bahama due to the storm, and Nassau International Airport was briefly shut down. A flight between Havana and Miami was canceled. In Cuba, officials forced 36,518 people to evacuate their homes, and workers also moved 68,780 livestock.

After Gordon emerged into the Atlantic north of Cuba, the National Hurricane Center issued a tropical storm warning for southern Florida from Jupiter to the Dry Tortugas, and later extended it to Boca Grande up along the west coast; this was extended to Bayport on the west coast and to Titusville on the east coast while the storm was approaching the Florida Keys. When Gordon attained hurricane status and turned suddenly to the northwest, a hurricane warning was issued from Bogue Banks to the North Carolina/Virginia border. Florida governor Lawton Chiles activated the state's Emergency Operations Center. In the Florida Keys, state parks were closed, which forced some campers to leave, and all schools were closed. On the mainland, University of Miami and Miami Dade College were also closed. Space Shuttle Atlantis was forced to land at Edwards Air Force Base in California instead of Kennedy Space Center. The storm caused flights to be canceled or delayed at Miami International Airport, and nearly all flights were canceled to and from the Florida Keys. Hundreds of people evacuated to shelters in five counties in east-central Florida. In North Carolina, officials suggested people in low-lying areas to go to higher ground, but they did not issue evacuation orders.

Impact

Although Gordon was a tropical storm for most of its existence, it caused enormous damage and loss of life. The United Nations estimated death toll in Haiti was 1,122. Six deaths were reported in Costa Rica, five in the Dominican Republic, two in Jamaica, two in Cuba, and eight in Florida. Property damage to the United States was estimated at $400 million (1994 USD$,   USD). Property damage statistics for the other affected areas are not available, but were reportedly severe in both Haiti and Cuba. The high death toll from Gordon made it the deadliest Atlantic hurricane since Hurricane David in 1979, which killed thousands in the Dominican Republic.

Central America
The first location affected by Gordon was Central America, when it briefly moved over northeastern Nicaragua as a tropical depression. Severe localized flooding occurred in Nicaragua, Panama, and most significantly Costa Rica. In Upala in the northern portion of the country, the rains damaged beans and rice crops. More than 700 homes were destroyed, leaving about 4,000 people homeless. Nationwide, the system killed six people and caused $30 million in damage. In Panama, the floods killed two people.

Jamaica
While passing south of Jamaica, Gordon dropped heavy rainfall, which caused flooding in six parishes, mostly in Clarendon and Saint Catherine. The rains caused flooding and mudslides that blocked roads. Gordon left $11.8 million in damage, mostly in Clarendon. About half of the overall damage was related to roads, and an additional quarter was due to crop damage. There were four deaths and two injuries in the country. Two of the deaths were drownings.

Hispaniola

The broad circulation of Gordon produced a persistent southerly flow across Hispaniola, causing orographic lift in mountainous regions. In Jacmel, Gordon dropped  in about 12 hours. The rains resulted in flooding and landslides across the country. There was knee-deep flooding in the shantytown of Cité Soleil, and in Jacmel, the rains increased levels along three rivers. There, the storm washed out the road connecting with Port-au-Prince, and three bridges were destroyed. In Jacmel, 725 houses were destroyed, forcing 1,500 people to stay at shelters. Gordon left portions of southeastern Haiti without water access. About 10,800 houses were damaged to some degree, and an additional 3,500 homes were destroyed. About 1.5 million people were directly affected in the country, mostly near Port-au-Prince and in the southern portion, and more than 89,000 people were left homeless. In Port-au-Prince, about 20,000 homes were flooded, and the bridge connecting the city with northern Haiti was also flooded. Overall damage in the country was estimated at $50 million.

The floods and mudslides killed many people in Haiti, although the exact total will likely never be known. On November 19, officials reported 531 deaths, and by two days later the total was potentially as high as 2,000. On November 24, the death toll reached 824, and the United Nations Office for the Coordination of Humanitarian Affairs reported on December 21 that Gordon killed 1,122 people in the country. Most of the deaths occurred in Port-au-Prince, Jacmel, and Léogâne. Damage was heavier in Haiti than elsewhere along Gordon's track due to poor infrastructure consisting of shacks on flood-prone denuded hills. The country suffers large death tolls from many hurricanes, caused in part by human activity. Large-scale deforestation left Haiti with about 1.4% of its forests as of 2004, leaving denuded mountain slopes that allows rainwater to wash down unimpeded. The lack of tree cover contributed to the devastating floods that caused most of Gordon's deaths.

In neighboring Dominican Republic, Gordon caused flooding and landslides that disrupted travel and communications to the interior portions of the country. Several slums around Santo Domingo flooded. The storm killed five people in the country.

Cuba and Bahamas
Shortly after moving over Jamaica, Gordon crossed over eastern Cuba. At Guantanamo Bay Naval Base, a station recorded  sustained winds, with gusts to  during a microburst. The storm caused widespread power outages and forced several roads to close. Damage was heaviest in Guantánamo Province, where  of seawalls and two aqueducts were destroyed. The storm damaged or destroyed 43 bridges, damaged  of roads, and wrecked  of rail lines. About  of underground electrical cables were damaged. There was heavy agricultural damage in southeastern Cuba, estimated at $45 million. Gordon damaged  of sugar cane fields and damaged or destroyed about 5.5 million banana trees. About 100,000 sacks of coffee were wrecked, amounting to $3.5 million in damage, and 50,000 litres of milk were ruined. While Gordon was paralleling northern Cuba, it produced high seas that caused flooding, including in Havana. Nationwide, the storm damaged 5,750 houses and destroyed 156 others. The cost of damage and reconstruction of homes and roads was $47.4 million, and there was an additional $9.5 million in damage to public buildings. Gordon killed two people in the country, which was kept to a minimum due to evacuations, and damage totaled $102 million. Two people were injured at Guantanamo Bay Naval Base. The flooding from Gordon followed two other similarly damaging events in the preceding year.

Gordon also affected the nearby Bahamas, producing  sustained winds at Kemps Bay, Andros.

Florida
In the Florida Keys, wind gusts up to  caused minor damage to trees and motor homes. Intense rainbands caused flooding in low-lying and poorly-draining areas, mostly in the upper Florida Keys. High tides closed portions of U.S. 1. In the Tampa Bay area, outer rainbands downed power lines and trees, one of which fell onto a car.

Gusts reached  at a location in southern Dade County. High waves from Gordon severely eroded beaches along the state's eastern coastline, and damaged coral and artificial reef systems. Several other boats sank or were beached, which prompted 37 rescues. Gordon spawned six tornadoes in the state, of which two did no damage and two caused minor damage. A tornado in Lake Worth damaged 39 homes and two businesses. The most damaging tornado was an F2 in southern Brevard County, which originated as a waterspout and moved onshore near Barefoot Bay. It moved through a mobile home community, destroying 62 homes and damaging 227 others to some extent; damage from the tornado was estimated at $10 million. The same tornado injured 40 people, causing six to be hospitalized, and killed an elderly man who died due to head trauma.

Across Florida, Gordon's winds damaged power lines and knocked down trees and traffic signals; about 425,000 people lost power due to the storm. The rains caused flooding in Dade and Collier counties, which damaged $275 million worth of crops, mostly to vegetables and sugar cane. In some locations, the crop damage was worse than during Hurricane Andrew in 1992, due to fewer crops being planted when Andrew struck the state. Along Elliott Key, Gordon damaged the coral reef system to a greater extent than Andrew. Inland flooding damaged buildings due to fast-rising water and roof collapses. In Volusia County, floods entered 1,236 buildings, causing $26 million in damage. Flooding caused dozens of roads to close, some of which were washed out. In the Everglades, flooding killed several deer. Statewide, two people drowned in separate instances after driving into flooded areas. Three people drowned along beaches, including one man who died in a rip current while attempting to rescue his son. In Hillsboro Inlet, two people drowned after their boat was overturned by high waves. Throughout Florida, Gordon directly killed eight people, and injured 43 people. There were also three indirect deaths; two were from traffic accidents, and one was related to a heart attack after a person pushed a stalled car in a flooded road. Statewide damage was estimated at $400 million (1994 USD$,   USD).

Remainder of United States

After affecting Florida, Gordon produced rainfall along much of the eastern United States, extending as far north as New Jersey.

High waves and tides resulted in significant beach erosion along the Outer Banks. The waves closed several portions of North Carolina Highway 12 for up to four days, and also closed a portion of U.S. Route 70 in eastern Carteret County. Heavy dune damage occurred on Ocracoke Island. The effects were similar to that of the 1991 Perfect Storm, although damage was lighter during Gordon. The hurricane destroyed five homes in Kitty Hawk, which were condemned after being previously damaged by Hurricane Emily in 1993. Also in Kitty Hawk, the storm damaged 52 houses and 2 businesses. In Rodanthe, two homes sustained water damage. The cost of the storm in the state was estimated at $314,000. Effects further south in North Carolina were lesser, although serious beach erosion was reported.

Offshore, a family of four required rescue from the Coast Guard after their boat began filling with water in the midst of  surf. The sailboat was sailing from Bermuda to Oxford, Maryland, but was halted after the engine failed, the anchor was ripped off, and the mainstay was torn. The interaction between Gordon and a ridge over New England produced coastal flooding in eastern Virginia. The high tides caused road damage and minor housing damage.

Aftermath
In Costa Rica, President José María Figueres declared a state of emergency due to flooding in that country. He sought $15 million in aid from the Inter-American Development Bank. The country's government handled relief efforts through its Red Cross and federal and non-governmental organizations. The government of Cuba issued an appeal to the United Nations Office for the Coordination of Humanitarian Affairs for financial assistance; as a result, the agency provided $30,000, and the United Nations Development Programme provided $50,000. The government of Luxembourg sent $37,000 worth of construction materials, and the European Union sent $443,000 to the country.

On November 16, the government of Haiti issued an appeal to the international community for assistance. In response, agencies through the United Nations donated $735,000, including 20,000 water units and 3,000 blankets. The United Nations Office for the Coordination of Humanitarian Affairs flew 30 tons of supplies, financed by Italy and Luxembourg. The European Union donated about $3.8 million to the country, and various countries sent about $1.8 million in cash or the equivalent thereof in relief items. The Canadian government donated $485,000, and the government of Japan sent $400,000 in aid. The government of France provided blankets, clothing, and tarpaulins, and the United States sent 5,000 blankets. In the days after the storm, the Haitian Army and international workers made emergency repairs to the road between Jacmel and Port-au-Prince, which was permanently reopened on November 25. The Haitian government provided $3.2 million to repair damage and assist those affected by the storm. The government sent about $112,000 to cities to provide for clearing roads, housing repairs, and for the funerals of storm victims. Workers from the United Nations set up relief work in Port-au-Prince. Assistance quickly reached the ravaged town of Jacmel, including 116 tons of food, 9 tons of medicine, and clothing. Six soldiers from the United States Special Forces rescued 35 Haitians using an inflatable boat. About 100 soldiers from the 10th Mountain Division assisted in relief operations in Jacmel, rescuing hundreds of people. About 12,000 United States troops were already in the country when Gordon struck to restore democracy under ousted president Jean-Bertrand Aristide.

Due to the crop damage in Florida, the price of vegetables across the United States rose. There were about 25,000 insurance claims following the storm's passage.

Despite the devastation in Haiti and the extensive damage in Cuba and Florida, Gordon was not retired by the World Meteorological Organization in Spring of 1995. Member nations of the World Meteorological Organization must send a delegate to the annual meeting to formally submit a request for tropical cyclone name retirement; for unknown reasons, Haiti did not send a delegate to the Spring 1995 meeting. Out of all the names on the North Atlantic naming list that have not been retired, Gordon is still considered the strongest candidate for retirement. The World Meteorological Organization issued an official statement crediting Jamaica and Cuba's warning infrastructure for the low loss of life there from Gordon, and blaming Haiti's lack of such a system for the large number of deaths there. 
 To this day, Gordon remains the deadliest hurricane to not have its name retired.

See also

 Other storms of the same name
 List of Category 1 Atlantic hurricanes
 List of North Carolina hurricanes (1980–1999)
 List of Florida hurricanes (1975–1999)
 Geography of Haiti
 1935 Jérémie hurricane – killed up to 2,000 people in Haiti
 Tropical Storm Fay (2008) – Took a similar winding path through the Caribbean and Florida
 Hurricane Eta (2020) – Deadly Category 4 hurricane that took a similar winding path through the Caribbean and Florida later in its lifetime

References

External links

 Hurricane Gordon 1994
 NOAA: The Retirement of Hurricane Names
 Weather Underground: Haiti's Hurricane History 
 Early Warning Saves Grief and Money

1994 Atlantic hurricane season
Category 1 Atlantic hurricanes
Hurricanes in Haiti
Hurricanes in Florida
Hurricanes in North Carolina
Hurricane Gordon